Elophila rosetta is a moth in the family Crambidae. It was described by Edward Meyrick in 1938. It is found on Java in Indonesia.

References

Acentropinae
Moths described in 1938
Moths of Indonesia